Abengoa Solar (formerly Solúcar Energía) is a subsidiary of Abengoa. Its primary activities include  designing, promotion, financing attainment, construction and operation of solar power stations that use photovoltaics, concentrated photovoltaics, or concentrated solar thermal technologies.

Abengoa Solar and innovation
R&D investment:
Over 42.4 million euros were invested in R&D in 2011 and a total over 150 million euros since 2007.

Patent rights:
Given the importance of R&D, legal protection of industrial and intellectual property advancements is critical. The company, therefore, holds priority rights to various key inventions. 115 CSP and PV technology patent applications were registered as of May 2012.

Solar power tower
Abengoa Solar owns Europe's first commercially operating concentrating solar power plant, the  PS10 Solar Power Plant, that use the solar power tower technology, a form of concentrated solar thermal technology. The Spanish plant was featured in an episode of World's Strangest on the SciFi network and James May's Big Ideas on the BBC.

Projects using their technology
 Solana Generating Station, Arizona

See also

 Solar power in Spain
 Renewable energy in the European Union
 Energy policy of the European Union

References

External links
 

Technology companies of Spain
Solar energy companies
Abengoa